Roy Norman (11 September 1896 – 3 March 1980) was an Australian sprinter. He competed in the men's 200 metres at the 1924 Summer Olympics.

References

External links
 

1896 births
1980 deaths
Athletes (track and field) at the 1924 Summer Olympics
Australian male sprinters
Olympic athletes of Australia
Place of birth missing